Spooky Songs for Creepy Kids is a compilation album released in 2010 by Cuban American dark cabaret singer Voltaire. It is a collection of Voltaire's songs, ranging from 1998's The Devil's Bris to 2008's To the Bottom of the Sea, with lyrics slightly modified in order to be more child-friendly (done by removing profanity and references to sexual intercourse). It also features some songs that were adapted in order to suit better for the world of the MMORPG AdventureQuest Worlds, in which Voltaire usually participates. It furthermore features two songs on which Voltaire collaborated for The Grim Adventures of Billy & Mandy.

Track listing

External links
 Voltaire's website
 Spooky Songs for Creepy Kids on Projekt Records' official website

2010 compilation albums
Voltaire (musician) albums